Paramanga Ernest Yonli (born 31 December 1956 in Tansarga, Tapoa Province) also known as Ernest Paramanga Yonli, is a Burkinabé politician. He was Prime Minister from 6 November 2000 to 3 June 2007 and then President of the Economic and Social Council of Burkina Faso until March 2015.

He is a member of the Congress for Democracy and Progress party and a Grand Officer of the National Order of Burkina Faso.

Biography

Yonli is a descendant of the last dynasty of the Gurma kingdom founded at the end of the 13th century by migrants from Kanem-Bornu, a region originally situated between modern Niger, Nigeria and Chad. This dynasty which is often confused with the history of the Gurma people, who live in Eastern Burkina Faso, can be subdivided into three lines, namely Yobri, Tambaga and Tansarga. Paramanga Ernest Yonli comes from one of the ruling families of the latter line of Tansarga.

Gurma society is organised around a power centre made up of a founding family, ministers of the court and the people. This power centre is governed by democratic principles whereby the Chief or the King is appointed following an aligned vote by all adult citizens. Paramanga Ernest Yonli's great-grandfather, grandfather and father each ruled Tansarga in the canton of Gobnangou in turn. Today his older brother remains the chief of the village of Tansarga.

He obtained his mathematics and natural sciences baccalaureate with honours in 1976.

At university level, following a degree in general economics at the University of Ouagadougou, he came top of his class in his Masters in economic sciences at the University of Benin in Togo, then completed his training with a PhD at the University of Groningen in the Netherlands. His thesis focused on "Farmer strategies in food security and cereal marketing: the role of cereal banks in the North Plateau-Central of Burkina Faso".

Paramanga Ernest Yonli is also a specialist in international economics (Paris I University – Pantheon Sorbonne) and development and agricultural economics (same institution).

Married to Safi, one of the daughters of former President Saye Zerbo (1980–82), he is father to four children.

Career
After working in the field of management and business administration in France, he began a career as a researcher at the University of Ouagadougou from 1985 to 1994. During this period, he became a member of an international multi-disciplinary research team, whose work focused on “risks in agriculture” in semi-arid areas. This international research body, whose headquarters is in Europe, brings together researchers from the European Union and ECOWAS countries like Ghana, Burkina Faso, Benin, Togo, the Ivory Coast, etc.

The PhD thesis which he defended in 1997 at the University of Groningen in the Netherlands was a logical progression from the research results discovered by this international team in Burkina Faso, particularly in the provinces of Yatenga, Sanmatenga, Namentenga, Bam and Passoré. In October 1994, Paramanga Ernest Yonli was appointed, in addition to his role as researcher, as Director General of the National Fund for the Promotion of Employment (F.A.P.E.). He was tasked with reorganising this body, which is aimed at promoting the self-employment of graduates from the country's universities and professional training colleges.

Upon receiving further funding, Yonli extended the Fund to craftsmen and to the informal sector. He simultaneously decentralised the Fund, opening branches in Burkina Faso's ten main towns after Ouagadougou and Bobo Dioulasso, thus also demonstrating his sense of innovation and openness to modernisation.

Political career
In 1992, during the first general elections which saw the return of Burkina Faso to rule of law, Yonli was approached to head up the list of ODP/MT candidates in his constituency of Tapoa. He declined the offer for personal reasons, but led the campaign which saw his party go on to win two of the three contested seats.

During the elections for the second government of the 4th Republic in 1997, whilst simultaneously serving as Cabinet Leader for Prime Minister Kadré Désiré Ouedraogo from 1996, he headed up the list of candidates for the ruling party, which had since become the Congress for Democracy and Progress (CDP). He won the two contested seats in his constituency, and would go on to do the same in 2002, in 2007 and in 2012.

Although elected four times as a Member of the National Assembly (1997 to 2012), Yonli never took his seat as an MP, going on instead to occupy senior governmental posts throughout this period. Firstly, as Cabinet Leader for the Prime Minister in 1996 as mentioned above, then as Minister of Civil Service and of State Reform in 1997, and finally as Prime Minister and Head of Government in 2000, a post which he would occupy for 7 years. He thus holds the record for the longest time spent in senior political posts in his country. Additionally he served as Minister of Finance from 2000 to 2002.

In 2007, he was appointed Ambassador for Burkina Faso to the United States. He would be the first Ambassador to bring together the entire Burkinabé community residing in the United States, as well as travelling regularly to the University of Houston in Texas to visit one of the largest Burkinabé student communities in the United States.

He returned to his home country in 2012 to become President of the Economic and Social Council, a post which he still occupies today.

Achievements for Burkina Faso
The leadership of Yonli was characterised by his innovation, his promotion of the fundamental values of Burkinabé society (dialogue – tolerance - forgiveness) and by efficiency.

Implementation of the Global Public Administration Reform (RGAP)
When in September 1997, President Blaise Compaoré appointed Yonli as Minister for Civil Service, he gave him the formidable task of overseeing the Global Public Administration Reform.  Following a number of attempts at reform, both with social partners and with members of the National Assembly, this project had still not been completed in spite of the government's overwhelming majority in the National Assembly (101 MPs out of 111). It was the first challenge taken up by Yonli. Following the start of his aforementioned role in September 1997, he would go on to organise national reform hearings in December of the same year and successfully secure the adoption of three laws governing the Global Public Administration Reform, as of the first session of the National Assembly in 1998.

Institutionalisation of social dialogue
To further cement the public administration reform, Yonli implemented a permanent consultation framework between trade union organisations and the government. This government-trade union meeting was to become institutionalised from 2000 when Yonli became the Burkinabé head of government. These now annual meetings allow the two sides to examine on a yearly basis the negotiating platform of trade union organisations on the one hand, and government actions aimed at the promotion and optimisation of the reform's content on the other. The institutionalisation of these meetings has helped reduce labour conflicts as much as possible, and to instil trust between the government and workers’ unions, both of which have shored up social stability which is a pre-requisite for the harmonious development of a nascent democracy.

Institutionalisation of government-private sector dialogue
In July 2001, in Bobo Dioulasso, Yonli decided in agreement with the business world, to institutionalise exchanges between the government and the entire private sector. Welcomed by the Chamber of Commerce and development partners, this meeting which is held yearly in the economic capital allows countries to share their economic and social achievements over the past year, gauge the extent of challenges faced and forecast for the year ahead. This meeting, which still takes place today, has become a key tool for economic governance in Burkina Faso, because it allows the government to make their interventions in the economic sector more targeted, in line with medium and long-term economic planning benchmarks.

National Youth Forum and Annual women’s conference
Drawing on the sectoral strategies of international organisations, under the Yonli government Burkina Faso decided to go beyond conventional gender management methods and organise annual meetings focused on women and young people in 2004. These meetings have served as a forum for self-reflection and brainstorming to effectively tackle the problem of promoting and developing these two social groups who make up more than 70% of the country's active population.

Creation of ‘’BURKINA 2025’’ and reintroduction of the National Territorial Development Plan (SNAT)

When Yonli became head of government at the end of 2000, he had three main objectives:
 Quickly restore peace after the assassination of journalist Norbert Zongo;
 Ensure decentralisation;
 Speed up the implementation of poverty reduction reforms.

These three objectives were tackled by a cabinet which he composed himself and submitted to Président COMPAORÉ who approved it without any significant changes. The cabinet, made up of technocrats, politicians and representatives from civil society, got to work on the priorities set by Yonli.

On a social level, dialogue was used as a driving force to foster the right conditions for peace through calls for tolerance and patriotism. In terms of the decentralisation objective, the government chose a progressive approach with a view to ensuring the best conditions for the adoption of this process by business managers, elected representatives and the wider population.

On an economic level, under the Yonli Government, economic growth went from an annual rate of between 3 and 4% to a rate ranging from 7 to 9%.

Decentralisation in Burkina Faso was kick-started. As a result, the process is now complete, and serves as a benchmark in the sub-region. Under the Yonli Government, 13 regions were created, making up the 4 provinces. furthermore the guidelines for decentralisation allowed for the number of communes to be changed from 55 to 30, in order to allow the population to appoint their local authorities, which led to the development of participatory democracy and also to the development of local economies.

Programmes to combat poverty, although not achieving all anticipated results, have made the country the best economic performer in the sub-region from the point of view of its multilateral partners.

It is also worth mentioning the ten-year education development programme, which has helped speed up the literacy rate. Under his Government the rate of school enrolment has gone from 39 to 70% in seven years.

Finally, instruments for the identification, evaluation and reduction of poverty have now become everyday tools for planning and economic governance leaders. These are all things which help to make development projects and programmes more targeted and yield faster and more tangible results.

This was consolidated thanks to the two major decisions which today underpin the country's economic and social governance:

 Making development part of the long-term perspective through the creation of a national roadmap called BURKINA 2025.
 The creation of a global visibility framework called the National Territorial Development Plan, which organises development by tapping into regional potential, with a view to optimising the various areas of expertise specific to each region.

Economic promotion of Burkina Faso overseas
In 2004, Yonli undertook a world tour to promote Burkina Faso's economic potential. The objective of his trip was to provide sufficient information on the economic potential of the country to thus increase its attractiveness to investors.

With this in mind, he visited, accompanied by business leaders:

 April 2004: Geneva, with 50 businessmen.
 October 2004: Canada, with 80 businessmen. During his visit he heavily emphasised Burkina Faso's gold mining potential.
 April 2005: France, with 70 businessmen.
 September 2005: Malaysia, again with around 50 businessmen.

The most significant results of this came after the visit to Canada. It was during this visit that major gold mines were opened, including the first gold mine in Taparko (Sanmatenga province). By 2009, six gold mines were operational, placing gold at the top of the list of products exported from the country, ahead of cotton. Currently, a new mining code is in the process of being adopted, with a view to striking a balance between the profits made by miners, the government and the local populations.

Achievements within the Economic and Social Council
Since 2012, as President of the Economic and Social Council, Yonli has published various reports including:
 A report on agriculture, which highlighted the need to develop this sector in Burkina Faso.
 A second report on gold and the need to submit a new mining code to the National Assembly.
 A third report on governance and distrust of public authority, with solutions for sustainable social stability.

Opposition to Article 37
Having reiterated the legality of such a Constitutional reform during a meeting of the CDP at the Stade du 4 Août, Yonli nevertheless officially participated in Autumn 2014 in the drafting of a public report to the Economic and Social Council on the political and social risks linked to such a Constitutional reform.

It is noteworthy that the National Assembly's draft vote on the reform of Article 37 of Burkina Faso's Constitution ultimately caused President Blaise Compaoré's demise.

Distinctions and awards
 Member of a number of charitable organisations
 Grand Officer of the National Order
 Officer of the National Order
 Commander of the Order of Brilliant Star with special grand cordon, of the Republic of China (Taiwan).

References

1956 births
Members of the National Assembly of Burkina Faso
Living people
University of Paris alumni
Prime Ministers of Burkina Faso
Ministers of Finance of Burkina Faso
Ambassadors of Burkina Faso to the United States
Congress for Democracy and Progress politicians
People from Est Region (Burkina Faso)
21st-century Burkinabé people